Q25 may refer to:
 Q25 (New York City bus)
 Al-Furqan, the 25th surah of the Quran
 Changhe Q25, a Chinese crossover vehicle
 Dinsmore Airport (California)
 , a Naïade-class submarine